Vic Clark is a retired American football coach.  He served as the head football coach at Thomas More College in Crestview Hills, Kentucky from 1990 to 1998 and at Rockford University in Rockford, Illinois from 2000 to 2002, compiling a career college football record of 71–48.

Head coaching record

References

Year of birth missing (living people)
Living people
Thomas More Saints football coaches
Rockford Regents football coaches